Amol County is in Mazandaran province, Iran. The capital of the county is the city of Amol. At the 2006 census, the county's population was 343,747 in 93,194 households. The following census in 2011 counted 370,774 people in 112,297 households. At the 2016 census, the county's population was 401,639 in 133,034 households.

Amol's neighbour counties are Babol in the east, Mahmudabad in the north, Babolsar in the northeast, Nur in the west in Mazandaran province, and Tehran province in the south.

Natural attractions
The county elevated landscape and valleys have dense forests. Its hills overlook the plains and stretch out to the high slopes of Damavand Mountains.
The majestic valleys, rivers, springs, waterfalls, colorful vegetation, diversity of wildlife, thermal springs, summer quarters and rural settlements appeal to visitors.

Mount Damavand, 5610 m, the highest point in the Middle East

Lar and Damavand Mountains
 These mountains form the two branch ranges of the central Alborz Mountains, and are the highest sections of this range. To the north, after the Kahu (Sefid Ab) Pass, in the village of Garmabdar (district of Roodbar-e-Qasran), it sub-divides into two, the north western and south eastern ranges. In the south western sector are the peaks of Takht-e-khers and Se sang, extending towards the west, where the gigantic Damavand Peak is visible.

In the southeastern sector, after running along the plains of Lar, the peaks of Haft Saran are apparent, and to the south of these plains are the peaks of Mehr Chal, Atashkadeh, Siyah Chal and Maaz. In the south eastern direction it joins the Khansak and Shad Kooh Mountains.

Haraz River
The Haraz River's source is in the skirts of the Alborz Mountains in the region of Larijan. After flowing along the Haraz Road and Valley for about 100 km. it meanders in the midst of the city of Amol, from where it reaches the Caspian Sea. The fringes of this river are utilized as recreational areas as well as for fishing.

Waterfall 
 Shahandasht: The Shahandasht Waterfall is the highest waterfall of Mazandaran Province. It is located in Shahandasht Village, 65 kilometers away from Amol, next to the Haraz Road from Amol to Tehran. It is 51 meters high flowing from the heart of Alborz Mountain. The waterfall consists of three waterfalls which make it 180 meters high. One can reach the waterfall by passing through the bridge of Vana Village and reaching the village of Shahandasht and walk towards the waterfall for 15 minutes on foot.
Amiri: Amiri waterfall’s height is more than 20 meters. It is located in Amiri Village, which is 120 km away from Tehran.
In order to reach this waterfall not much walking is needed, one could get to the waterfall by simply following the twentieth Shams Abad ally towards its end.
 Yakhi: Yakhi Waterfall with a height of 12 meters, is located in the vicinity of Doudkouh Mountain near the southern part of Damavand Peak in Mazandaran province.
This waterfall is spectacular in that it is completely frozen throughout the year, except the trickle of water flowing from melting glacier above it for a short period in summer. The said waterfall is one of its own in the world.

The other proposed Waterfall in county named, Ab Murad, Plas, Tara, Sang Darka, Qaleh Dokhtar, Peromed and Deryouk.

Springs and mineral water
 Ab Garm-e Larijan Thermal Springs: This thermal spring is near the Rineh village (Larijan). Its water is used in the treatment of joint disorders, skin diseases and infections. Damavand has some thermal springs (Abe Garm Larijan) with therapeutic qualities. These mineral hot springs are mainly located on the volcano's flanks and at the base, giving evidence of volcanic heat comparatively near the surface of the earth. While no historic eruptions have been recorded, hot springs at the base and on the flanks, and fumaroles and solfatara near the summit, indicate a hot or cooling magma body still present beneath the volcano, so that Damavand is a potentially active volcano.
In this village there are many hot baths. Of about 1,000 liters of water per minute Chshmە larijan SPA is removed. Its temperature is between 65 and 70 degrees Celsius. The unpleasant taste and odor of hydrogen sulfide and water color is clear. This is the source of magnesium and bicarbonate salts for skin disease, old wounds, rheumatism, respiratory tract diseases and neurological disorders is beneficial. Bath's monuments in the village of Shah Abbas Safavid period is related to
The most important of these hot springs are located in Abe Garm Larijan in a village by the name Larijan in the district of Larijan in Lar Valley . The water from this spring is useful in the treatment of chronic wounds and skin diseases. Near these springs there are public baths with small pools for public use
 Ab Ask Thermal Springs: These springs are located in a village by the same name in the district of Larijan. Surrounding this spring are limestone deposits which through the passage of time turn into marble. The water from this spring is useful in the treatment of chronic wounds, and skin diseases.
 Amoloo Mineral Water Spring: The water from this spring can be used for drinking purposes, and is useful in treating gastro-intestinal disorders. The same can be used for skin diseases also.
 Alamol: This waterfall flows from the northern slopes of the Damavand Mountains, and is more than 100 m. in height. The massive output of water from this waterfall forms a spray like mist in the air and brings about a wonderful sight.
 Esterabekoh

Geography 
This area with its elevated landscape and valleys has dense forests. Its tall hills overlook the plains and stretch out till the high slopes of the Damavand Mountains. The majestic and deep rocky valleys, rivers, numerous springs, elevated waterfalls, colorful vegetation, a variety of wild life, thermal springs, summer quarters, and rural settlements are some of the special factors which can prove attractive.
 Mirza Kuchak Khan Forest Park: The same is located 18 km. on the Amol - Tehran road, the Haraz River flowing on the eastern side of which.
 Alimastan: Alimestan Jungle is known as the Green Gold, dense fog, thick and green forests. The forest habitat plant "Alyma" grows in May which name is derived from the forest Alimestan. It has low temperature in the hot season. Numerous springs, diverse forest covers, plain and clear water, and horses are the indicators of the forest. Above all this, the Alimestan peak, about 2510 meters high, attracts many hikers in the winter and spring.
 Baliran There has thick forests and meadows. up until present Garm Rud 2 is the only well dated Upper Paleolithic settlement at the north of Iranian plateau. The land around the Baleyrān normal hill, but in the north it is flat.
 Halumsar
 Ziaru

Administrative divisions

The population history and structural changes of Amol County's administrative divisions over three consecutive censuses are shown in the following table. The latest census shows five districts, 11 rural districts, and five cities.

Economy
Mineral water, meat, dairy, Wood and ingots the main production industrial are. Agriculture and Tourism are the basis economy Amol economic base is in its provincial products. Agriculture has always been a major part of the economy in and around Amol.
Amol is the economic center of Mazandaran province, with Agriculture, Industrial factories and Tourism being the base of the Amol economy.  Rice, grain, fruits, cotton, tea, sugarcane, and silk are produced in the lowland. Mineral water, meat, dairy, wood and ingots are the main manufacturing industry.

Industry 
Amol has extensive human relations in the country due to its extensive economic activities, about 70 thousand workers are working in 5 industrial towns of Amol. Amol is Mazandaran's export pole 79% of Mazandaran exports belong to county. Amol owns 47% of the province's industry.

Tourism
In city and county:

Larijan

Many historical and natural attractions in its place. This region has mountain villages, plains and meadows immense. Now due to the Damavand Haraz River originates best and highest-quality trout is bred in the region of the Middle East. This is one of the most mythic Iran named Arash.
 Damavand Mountain is a stratovolcano which is the highest peak in Iran and the Middle East. It has a special place in Persian mythology and folklore.
 Tomb of Mir Bozorg (Qavam al-Din Marashi Mausoleum)
 Lar Dam
 Lar National Park
 Fire temple Amol
 Naser-Ol-Hagh Kabir Mausoleum (Hasan al-Utrush Tomb tower)
 Sayyid Haydar Amoli (Seyyed Se Tan Tomb tower)
 Moalagh Bridge
 Davazdah Cheshmeh
 Waterfall Shahandasht
 Amol Bazaar 
 Museum of History
 Imamzadeh Ibrahim 
 Malek Bahman Castle Shrine
 Shekl-e Shah (Relief Naser al-Din Shah Qajar)
 Jame Mosque
 Agha Abbas Mosque
 Yakhi Waterfall
 Dokhaharan lake
 Waterfall Deryouk
 Shah Abbasi Baths
 Fireplace (known as Shams Al-Rasol)
 The Sasanian Road
 Tower Khidr Nabi
 Tomb of Sultan Shahabuddin
 Village forest Blairan 
 Village forest Alimastan
 Gol-e Zard Cave
 Ashraf Bath 
 Inn Kemboja
 House Manouchehri
 House Shafahi
 Heshtl Tower
 Mirza Muhammad Ali Mosque
 Kahrud Castle
 Sangi Bridge Polour
 Imam Hassan Askari Mosque
 Imamzadeh Qasem Shrine
 Imamzadeh Abdollah Shrine 
 Mohammad Taher Shrine
 Ab ask Thermal Springs 
 Lake Sahon
 Haj Ali Kochak Mosque
 Ab Murad Waterfall
 Sang Darka Waterfall
 Dehkadeh Talaei Park
 Amoloo Mineral Water Spring
 Forest Park Mirza Kuchak Khan Haraz
 Forest Park Halumsar
 Castle Kahrud
 Larijan Thermal Spring
 Hosseinieh of Amol
 Gabri Tower
 Mir-Safi Baths
 Tomb Darvish Sheikh Ismail
 Robat Sangi Polur
 Prairie anemone of Polur
 Ziaru Jungle
 Haj Ali Arbab House
 Do Berar Peak
 Ancient Hill Qaleh Kesh
 Larijan Thermal Spring
 Kolakchal Mountain
 Ghoredagh Mountain
 Municipal House
 Tekyeh Firuz Kola
 Pol-e Mun Castle
 Saghanefar Hendoukola
 Saghanefar Zarrin Kola
 Tekyeh Oji Abad
 Karna Cave
 Div Asiyab Spring

References

 اطلس گیتاشناسی استان‌های ایران [Atlas Gitashenasi Ostanhai Iran] (Gitashenasi Province Atlas of Iran)
Damavand Mountaineering Guide
Summit Post: Damavand

Gallery

 

Counties of Mazandaran Province